Sher Lama (born 9 January 1973) is a Nepali born Hong Kong cricketer who has played one One Day International and four ICC Trophy matches for Hong Kong. He is the first Nepal-born cricketer to play a One Day International when he debuted against Bangladesh in 2004 Asia cup. His only One Day International saw him hit 16 unbeaten runs against Bangladesh at the 2004 Asia Cup from number nine in the batting order, which was the second-highest score of the Hong Kong innings. However, it did not prevent him being left out of the second match against Pakistan. Lama also played four matches at the 2001 ICC Trophy, scoring 38 runs with a highest score of 19 (against United States) and bowling 16 overs without taking a wicket. He has also coached Hong Kong national women's team.

References 

 

1973 births
Living people
Hong Kong cricketers
Hong Kong One Day International cricketers
Hong Kong people of Nepalese descent